Ricardo Ovidio Valencia (born 1927 – died April 20, 2010, in Santa Ana, El Salvador) was a Salvadoran footballer who played most of his career in C.D. FAS.

Playing career

Club career
Nicknamed el Chilenito (the little Chilean), Santa Ana-born and raised Ricardo Valencia joined the newly formed team FAS in 1949. He spent 10 years with the club scoring 62 goals and winning 3 titles including one where the entire FAS team was made up of players from Santa Ana. He also played for Once Municipal during 1955 and 1957.

In 1959, he was sold to Atletico Constancia for one colon he played there for one year and then returned to FAS before retiring from football.

International career
Valencia has made 26 appearances for the El Salvador national football team, scoring five goals. In 1954 he won the gold medal with the Salvadoran team in the Juegos Deportivos Centroamericanos, winning the group which contained Mexico, Colombia, Cuba and Panama.

Retirement and death
After retiring from football, Valencia worked for the Comisión Ejecutiva Hidroeléctrica del Río Lempa (CEL) for more than 30 years. He still remained active with the El Salvador national team and C.D. FAS.

On April 20, 2010, Ricardo Valencia died after suffering respiratory insufficiency, brought on by a pulmonary fibrosis. He is buried at the Cementerio Santa Isabel, de Santa Ana next to his wife Rosa Isabel de Valencia.

Honours

Domestic
Primera División: 3
 1951-52, 1953–54, 1957–58

International
Central American and Caribbean Games: 1
 1954

References

External links
Falleció "el chilenito" Valencia - El Salvador.com 
 

1927 births
2010 deaths
Sportspeople from Santa Ana, El Salvador
Association football forwards
Salvadoran footballers
El Salvador international footballers
C.D. FAS footballers
Once Municipal footballers
Deaths from pulmonary fibrosis
Central American and Caribbean Games gold medalists for El Salvador
Central American and Caribbean Games medalists in football
Competitors at the 1954 Central American and Caribbean Games